{{DISPLAYTITLE:C4H4F6O}}
The molecular formula C4H4F6O may refer to:

 Flurothyl, a volatile liquid drug from the halogenated ether family
 Isoflurothyl, a fluorinated ether related to the inhalational convulsant flurothyl